The name Bertha has been used for ten tropical cyclones in the Atlantic Ocean.

 Tropical Storm Bertha (1957), a moderate tropical storm that threatened areas devastated by Hurricane Audrey two months earlier, but did not become a hurricane and caused only minor damage.
 Tropical Storm Bertha (1984), a minimal tropical storm that formed in the mid-Atlantic and never threatened land.
 Hurricane Bertha (1990), a Category 1 Hurricane that moved north, parallel to the east coast of the United States before dissipating over Nova Scotia leaving nine dead, including six on a ship sunk by the storm.
 Hurricane Bertha (1996), a Category 3 hurricane that crossed the Leeward Islands and passed near Puerto Rico, later making landfall in North Carolina as a Category 2 storm, causing $270 million in damage to the United States and resulted in many indirect deaths.
 Tropical Storm Bertha (2002), a minimal tropical storm that formed only two hours before landfall in Louisiana, dissipated, exited back into the Gulf of Mexico, striking South Texas as a Tropical Depression. Bertha caused minimal damage, and one person drowned.
 Hurricane Bertha (2008), a long-lived Category 3 hurricane.
 Hurricane Bertha (2014), a Category 1 hurricane that affected the Antilles and the East Coast of the United States, and whose remnants affected Western Europe.
 Tropical Storm Bertha (2020), a pre-season tropical storm that formed only an hour before making landfall in South Carolina.

In the South-West Indian:
 Cyclone Bertha (1962)

Australian Region:
 Cyclone Bertha (1964) – 

Atlantic hurricane set index articles
Australian region cyclone set index articles
South-West Indian Ocean cyclone set index articles